Duddhi is a constituency of the Uttar Pradesh Legislative Assembly covering the city of Duddhi in the Sonbhadra district of Uttar Pradesh, India. Duddhi is one of five assembly constituencies in the Robertsganj Lok Sabha constituency and is reserved for candidates of the Schedule Tribes.

Election results

2022

2017
Apna Dal (Sonelal) candidate Hariram won in 2017 Uttar Pradesh Legislative Elections  defeating Bahujan Samaj Party candidate Vijay Singh Gond by a margin of 1,085 votes.

References

External links
 

Assembly constituencies of Uttar Pradesh
Sonbhadra district